Los Pellines is a sparsely populated rural area near the coast of Valdivia, southern Chile. The area is known for its beautiful views but faces a scarcity of water. Since 2017 Los Pellines have seen an upsurge of real estate enterprises seeking to sell plots of land for buyers interested in building country houses.

References

Populated places in Valdivia Province